The 2015 Louisville Cardinals football team represented the University of Louisville in the 2015 NCAA Division I FBS football season. The Cardinals were led by second-year head coach Bobby Petrino, who began his second stint at Louisville in 2014 season after eight years away. The team played its 18th season at its current home of Papa John's Cardinal Stadium in Louisville, Kentucky. They competed in the Atlantic Coast Conference in the Atlantic Division. They finished the season 8–5, 5–3 in ACC play to finish in third place in the Atlantic Division. They were invited to the Music City Bowl where they defeated Texas A&M.

Personnel

Coaching staff

Roster

Schedule
Louisville announced their 2015 football schedule on January 29, 2015. The 2015 schedule consist of six home games, five away games and one neutral site game in the regular season. The Cardinals will host ACC foes Boston College, Clemson, Syracuse, and Virginia, and will travel to Florida State, NC State, Pittsburgh, and Wake Forest.

Schedule source:

References

Louisville
Louisville Cardinals football seasons
Music City Bowl champion seasons
Louisville Cardinals football